Hyun-ho or Hyeon-ho is a Korean unisex given name. The meaning differs based on the hanja used to write each syllable of the name. There are 35 hanja with the reading "Hyun" and 49 hanja with the reading "Ho" on the South Korean government's official list of hanja which may be registered for use in given names.

People with this name include:

 Lee Hyun-ho (born 1988), South Korean football player
 Lee Hyun-ho (baseball) (born 1992), South Korean baseball player
 Shin Hyun-ho (born 1953), South Korean football player
 Cha Ye-ryun (birth name Park Hyun-ho, born 1985), South Korean actress

See also
 List of Korean given names

References

Korean unisex given names